case/lang/veirs is a Canadian-American supergroup consisting of Neko Case, k.d. lang, and Laura Veirs, formed in Portland, Oregon in 2013. The group launched with a June 2016 eponymous album, followed by a 19-city summer 2016 tour.

History
The trio of case/lang/veirs was formed in 2013, three years before the album release, when Lang, in a one-line e-mail, invited Case and Veirs to join her, and they responded affirmatively within 30 minutes. 

The three musicians had decades of experience making music and recorded over 30 studio albums. 

Lang, who previously collaborated with Dwight Yoakam, Madeleine Peyroux and Ann Wilson, has said that she was considering retirement before forming the band, and she always wanted to "be part of a band, a real collaborative effort". 

The band's sound is described as alt-country. 

Two of the band members, lang and Veirs, live in Portland; Case joined them from her home in Vermont.

Members
Neko Case – vocals
k.d. lang – vocals, acoustic guitar
Laura Veirs – vocals, guitars

Discography

References

External links

 (archived version)

2010 establishments in Oregon
American alternative country groups
Canadian alternative country groups
Musical groups established in the 2010s
Musical groups from Portland, Oregon
Rock music supergroups